Magnetic South is the first solo album by American singer-songwriter Michael Nesmith during his post-Monkees career. Released by RCA Records in 1970, the album peaked at Number 143 on the Billboard Pop Albums charts and Number 49 in Canada. Magnetic South is considered an early example of country rock. A single, "Joanne/One Rose" was taken from the album and reached Number 21 on the Billboard singles charts and Number 6 on the Adult Contemporary charts, #5 on the Australian chart, and #4 in Canada. It was the highest position of Nesmith's solo career.

History 
Nesmith formed the backing group "The First National Band" and gave them billing on both the cover and label of the record. Band member John London had previously played bass on several Monkees tracks and appeared as an extra on several episodes of the TV show, while Red Rhodes had played on a few 1969 Monkees tracks, notably "Steam Engine."

Five of the album's eleven tracks are from Nesmith's career with The Monkees. The first four tracks were recorded in 1968-69 for The Monkees, while "Hollywood" was also recorded in 1968 but first demoed by Nesmith for possible inclusion on The Monkees 1967 album Headquarters. Although at the time Nesmith was attempting to distance himself from The Monkees, he did dedicate the album to Bert Schneider, David, Micky, and Peter (as well as to Lester Sill). Nesmith would not allude to or mention the Monkees by name again publicly until The Michael Nesmith Radio Special, nine years later.

RCA Victor producer Felton Jarvis was given production credit even though he did no actual production work — the credit was primarily a thanks to Jarvis for helping sign Nesmith and the First National Band to RCA Records.  Jarvis was also the only person ever listed as producer of a Michael Nesmith album other than Nesmith himself.

Magnetic South was reissued in 1999 as 16 Original Classics with five bonus tracks. It was also reissued with Loose Salute (both remastered) on CD by RCA/BMG International in 2000. The album (without bonus tracks) was in the five-album slipcase set Original Album Classics in 2015, issued by RCA/SONY Music/Legacy.

Reception 

Magnetic South was only a moderate commercial success, but the album did succeed in reinventing Nesmith and helped somewhat in escaping his image as a Monkee. During one of the band's first gigs, they played alongside Gram Parsons and the brand new Flying Burrito Brothers. Nesmith recalls how others seeing a former Monkee decked out in a Nudie suit with a steel player in tow must have been laughable to seasoned Country devotees, such as Parsons. However, their unique sound was enough to win over the LA club scene and create a new image for Nesmith.

Allmusic stated in their review "Mixing a country sound with a rocker's instincts and blending airy thoughts on the nature of life and love with iconography of life in the West that brought together the old and the new, Michael Nesmith reveled in contradictions on Magnetic South, making them sound as comfortable as well-worn cowboy boots and as fun as a Saturday night barn dance. It's a minor masterpiece of country-rock, and while the Eagles may have sold more records, Nesmith yodels a hell of a lot better than any of them."

Track listing 
All songs by Michael Nesmith except where noted:
 "Calico Girlfriend" – 2:37
 "Nine Times Blue" – 1:39
 "Little Red Rider" – 2:34
 "The Crippled Lion" – 3:10
 "Joanne" – 3:10
 "First National Rag" (Red Rhodes) – 0:21
 "Mama Nantucket" – 2:36
 "Keys to the Car" – 2:52
 "Hollywood" – 5:03
 "One Rose" (Del Lyon, Lani McIntyre) – 3:27
 "Beyond the Blue Horizon" (Richard A. Whiting, W. Franke Harling, Leo Robin) – 5:55
Bonus tracks on 16 Original Classics re-release
 "Silver Moon" – 3:11  
 "Lady of the Valley" – 2:57  
 "Here I Am" – 3:19  
 "Nevada Fighter" – 3:08  
 "Tumbling Tumbleweeds" (Bob Nolan) – 3:49

Personnel 
 Michael Nesmith – vocals, guitar
 Red Rhodes – pedal steel guitar
 John Ware – drums
 John London – bass
with:
 Earl P. Ball – side piano
 Glen Hardin - piano, keyboards, tracks 12-16

References 

1970 albums
Albums produced by Felton Jarvis
Country rock albums by American artists
Michael Nesmith albums
RCA Records albums